Mayors for Peace is an international organization of cities dedicated to the promotion of peace that was established in 1982 at the initiative of then Mayor of Hiroshima Takeshi Araki, in response to the deaths of around 140,000 people due to the atomic bombing of the city on August 6, 1945.

The current mayor of Hiroshima, Kazumi Matsui, is the President of the organization as of his April 2011 inauguration.

Mayors for Peace was started in Japan, and since then Mayors throughout the World have signed on. When Mayors sign on, it means they support the commencement of negotiations towards the elimination of nuclear weapons by the year 2020.

In September 2015, Mayors for Peace counted around 6,800 member cities in 161 countries and territories around the world.

The Mayors for Peace 2020 Vision Campaign 
The 2020 Vision Campaign is the main vehicle for advancing the agenda of Mayors for Peace, a nuclear-weapon-free world by the year 2020. It was initiated on a provisional basis by the Executive Cities of Mayors for Peace at their meeting in Manchester, UK, in October 2003. It was launched under the name 'Emergency Campaign to Ban Nuclear Weapons' in November of that year at the 2nd Citizens Assembly for the Elimination of Nuclear Weapons held in Nagasaki, Japan. In August 2005, the World Conference endorsed continuation of the Campaign under the title of the '2020 Vision Campaign'.

From May 2008 till May 2009, the main focus of the work of the 2020 Vision Campaign has been the signature drive for the Cities Appeal in support of the Hiroshima-Nagasaki Protocol. The Protocol embeds the objective of the 2020 Vision Campaign in a realistic framework. As a protocol to the Treaty on the Non-Proliferation of Nuclear Weapons (NPT), it seeks to challenge national governments to follow through on the commitments they made in Article VI the Treaty.

By signing the Cities Appeal, Mayors and elected local officials around the world are given the chance to get behind the Hiroshima-Nagasaki Protocol ahead of the formal and final presentation of the results of the international signature drive at the 2010 NPT Review Conference at the United Nations Headquarters in New York.

Activities in the U.S. 
In western Massachusetts, a campaign was spearheaded from grassroots organizers in eleven towns. After two years of hard working starting in the autumn of 2005 and continuing today, all eleven Western Mayors have signed on to the campaign.

This encouraged some legislative action, and the state Republicans brought forth a resolution for nuclear abolition by 2020 which passed in the Massachusetts House and Senate. Senator Ted Kennedy was asked to bring the resolution to the federal level. However, after Kennedy died, there are no plans to see the resolution at a national level.

2011 Nobel Peace Prize nomination 
Mayors for Peace were nominated for 2011 Nobel Peace Prize by 1976 Peace Prize laureate Mairead Maguire. Maguire, who nominated Mayors for Peace and Nihon Hidankyo jointly for the prize, said she believes that "both organizations have fulfilled the wish of Alfred Nobel to work for peace and disarmament and awarding the prize jointly to them would recognize the great sacrifice of especially the hibakusha and give support and encouragement to all working on one of the greatest challenges to humanity – to rid the world of all nuclear weapons and build peace amongst the human family."

See also
 The Ribbon International

References

External links
Official website
Mayors for Peace 2020 Vision Campaign website

Non-profit organizations based in Japan
Peace organizations
International Campaign to Abolish Nuclear Weapons
International political organizations
Organizations established in 1982
Municipal international relations
1982 establishments in Japan